Hindman is an unincorporated community in Dawson County, Texas, United States.

Notes

Unincorporated communities in Dawson County, Texas
Unincorporated communities in Texas